A concert march is a march specifically composed for a concert band, brass band or an orchestra (to be played at a formal concert or other audience event). See march music.

Concert marches are mostly similar to regular military marches or field marches except for these differences:

Concert marches usually contain more difficult rhythms which in other cases, such as marching, would be awkward to play.
Concert marches may have more intricate harmonies
Although most concert marches follow the standard march form, some do not. William Latham's "Brighton Beach" for example, follows an IAABABATITCoda form.
Concert marches tend to have codas.
Concert marches may be played slower (100-120 b/m)
Concert marches tend to be longer.
Concert marches tend to have longer introductions.
Concert marches tend to be in forte, to play louder.

As with every single type of march (from Military to Concert to Screamer and contest marches), they usually have an introduction, at least three melodies, and a trio.

Some of the most-performed concert march composers are Edward Elgar, William Walton, Johann Strauss I, Johann Strauss II, Josef Wagner, Julius Fučík, John Philip Sousa, Karl L. King, Henry Fillmore, C.L. Barnhouse, Kenneth Alford, and J. J. Richards.

March music